Colazza is a comune (municipality) in the Province of Novara in the Italian region of Piedmont, located about  northeast of Turin and about  north of Novara.

Colazza borders the following municipalities: Ameno, Armeno, Invorio, Meina, and Pisano.

Demographic evolution

References

Cities and towns in Piedmont